Runar Salvatore Toto Schillaci Filper (born 26 May 1964) is a Swedish politician and member of the Riksdag for the Sweden Democrats party.

Filper has been a member of the municipal council for Sunne Municipality and the SD's district chairman for Värmland County since 2002. Filper has also been a member of the Riksdag since 2014. Following his election there was some controversy when it was revealed he had previously been convicted of assault in the 1980s.

References 

1964 births
Living people
Members of the Riksdag from the Sweden Democrats
Members of the Riksdag 2014–2018
Members of the Riksdag 2018–2022
Members of the Riksdag 2022–2026
21st-century Swedish politicians